Skyline is a solo album by Steve Howe. The music is usually very calm and simple, which is not conventional for Howe. As he said in an interview, "You go through the music; there's something, there's some little thread that carries through them, and that's certainly true with this album, but the only thing is because of the mood of the music and sort of relaxness of the music, it's been harder for me to actually create the spiral that I'm trying to create."

Track listings
All tracks composed by Steve Howe except where otherwise noted.

Small Acts of Human Kindness - 4:21
Meridian Strings (Howe, Paul Sutin) - 5:27
Secret Arrow (Howe, Sutin) - 4:25
Moon Song (Howe, Sutin) - 4:30
Shifting Sands (Howe, Sutin) - 5:51
Avenue de Bel Air (Howe, Sutin) - 6:38
Resonance - 5:27
The Anchor - 2:51
Moment in Time (Howe, Sutin) - 6:50
Simplification - 3:18
Camera Obscura (Howe, Sutin) - 6:30
Small Acts - 3:50

Musicians
Steve Howe / guitars, bass, keyboards
Paul Sutin / keyboards, percussion

References

Steve Howe (musician) albums
2002 albums
Inside Out Music albums